Bertkauia is a genus of insects in the family Epipsocidae. There are at least 2 described species in Bertkauia.

Species
 Bertkauia crosbyana Chapman, 1930
 Bertkauia lepicidinaria Chapman, 1930

References

 Lienhard, Charles, and Courtenay N. Smithers (2002). "Psocoptera (Insecta): World Catalogue and Bibliography". Instrumenta Biodiversitatis, vol. 5, xli + 745.

Further reading

External links

 NCBI Taxonomy Browser, Bertkauia

Epipsocidae